The men's long jump event at the 2016 IAAF World U20 Championships was held at Zdzisław Krzyszkowiak Stadium on 19 and 20 July.

Medalists

Records

Results

Qualification
Qualification: 7.70 (Q) or at least 12 best performers (q) qualified for the final.

Final

References

Long jump
Long jump at the World Athletics U20 Championships